Romainville - Carnot is a future station on line 11 of the Paris Métro. The station is located on the Place Carnot at Romainville and near Noisy-le-Sec. The station is slated to open in 2024. It is named after the nearby Place Carnot, located 60 m south of it.

History 
Since the 1920s, it was planned that line 11 would be extended to Place Carnot from its then eastern terminus at Portes des Lilas. On 2 April 2021, the tunnel boring machine, Sofia, arrived at the station with excavation works for the station box completed 2 months later.

Passenger services

Access 
The station will have two entrances, with the main entrance (with a lift) located at the corner of rue de la République and boulevard Henri Barbusse and the other entrance located on the other side of Place Carnot, at the corner of rue Carnot and rue Anatole France.

Station layout

Platforms 
The station will have a standard configuration with 2 tracks surrounded by 2 side platforms.

Other connections 
The station will also be served by lines 105, 318, and 322 of the RATP bus network, and at night, by lines N12 and N23 of the Noctilien bus network. It could also be served by tramway T1 in the future when it is extended to Val de Fontenay.

Gallery

References 

Paris Métro line 11
Future Paris Métro stations
Railway stations scheduled to open in 2023
Paris Métro stations in Seine-Saint-Denis